Carmen Anthony Orechio (November 4, 1926 – February 26, 2018) was an American politician who served as President of the New Jersey Senate and as Commissioner and Mayor of Nutley, New Jersey.

Early life and education
Orechio was born in 1926 in Nutley, New Jersey. He graduated from Nutley High School and Rutgers University. During World War II, he served in the United States Army with the European Occupational Forces.

Career 
Orechio was elected to the Nutley Board of Commissioners in 1968. During his tenure as commissioner he served as Director of the Department of Public Safety and as Director of the Department of Public Affairs. He served as Mayor of Nutley three times: 1972–1976, 1980–1984, and 1992–1996. He was the first Italian-American Mayor of Nutley, New Jersey.

He ran for the State Assembly in 1969, running in Essex County District 11C with fellow Democrat Joseph Iannuzzi. They were defeated by the Republican incumbents, C. Richard Fiore, and Ralph R. Caputo.

In 1973, Orechio was elected to the New Jersey Senate from Essex County. He defeated two-term incumbent Republican Michael Giuliano by 3,483 votes in the Democratic landslide of 1973, 29,878 (53%) to 26,395 (47%). He was re-elected to a second term in 1977 against Republican Assemblyman John N. Dennis by 918 votes, 25,773 (51%)to 24,855 (49.%). He was re-elected in 1981 by 1,060 votes against Republican John Crecco, a Bloomfield Councilman, 30,990 (49%) to 29,930 (48%). In 1983, he won his fourth term against Ralph J. Salerno, a Republican attorney from Bloomfield. Orechio received 28,613 (54%) to 23,523 (44%) for Salerno and 1,061 (2%) for Martin Scaturo, a former Democratic Essex County Freeholder who was running as an Independent. He was re-elected to a fifth term in the Senate in 1987, defeating Thomas Zampino (later a New Jersey Superior Court Judge), 20,949 (50%) to 18,455 (44%). John Kinder, who had served many years as the Republican Mayor of Bloomfield, received 2,371 (6%) of the vote as an Independent.

He served as Senate Majority Leader in 1981 and as Senate President from 1982 to 1985. In 1991, due to redistricting following the 1990 census, the 30th Legislative District represented by Orechio was moved to the south to form a new district. Rather than run in the 36th District against fellow Democratic incumbent Gabriel M. Ambrosio of Lyndhurst, Orechio announced that he would not seek re-election to the Senate.

In 2008, after 40 years of service on the Nutley Board of Commissioners, Orechio lost his 11th re-election bid by 29 votes.

Death 
Orechio died on February 26, 2018, in Nutley, New Jersey at the age of 91.

References

External links
Carmen A. Orechio at The Political Graveyard

|-

|-

|-

|-

|-

1926 births
2018 deaths
People from Nutley, New Jersey
Military personnel from New Jersey
Rutgers University alumni
Mayors of Nutley, New Jersey
New Jersey city council members
Democratic Party New Jersey state senators
Presidents of the New Jersey Senate
American people of Italian descent
United States Army personnel of World War II